Douglass Place is a group of historic rowhouses located at Baltimore, Maryland, United States. Built in 1892, it represents typical "alley houses" of the period in Baltimore, two narrow bays wide, two stories high over a cellar, with shed roofs pitched to the rear. Italianate influence is reflected in their segmental-arched window and door openings, and in the simple molded sheet metal cornices which crown the buildings. Frederick Douglass (1818-1895) constructed the five buildings as rental housing for blacks in the Fells Point area of Baltimore, where he had resided from the 1820s to 1838. The site was the location of the Dallas Street Station Methodist Episcopal Church, which he had attended while living in the area.

Douglass Place was listed on the National Register of Historic Places in 1983.

References

External links
, including photo from 2003, at Maryland Historical Trust

African-American historic places
African-American history in Baltimore
Fell's Point, Baltimore
Houses completed in 1892
Houses in Baltimore
Houses on the National Register of Historic Places in Baltimore
Italianate architecture in Maryland
Southeast Baltimore
Baltimore City Landmarks